Keo Puth Rasmey (born 1 October 1952) is a Cambodian politician. On 19 October 2006 he was appointed to lead Funcinpec, the royalist party of Cambodia, replacing former leader Norodom Ranariddh. He is the son-in-law of Norodom Sihanouk, former king of Cambodia, and is of Cambodian descent. When his wife Arunrasmey resigned as the First Vice President of FUNCINPEC in March 2015, Keo was appointed to replace her as the First Vice President.

See also
Politics of Cambodia

References

External links
Cambodian royalists aim to remove prince

Cambodian people of Chinese descent
FUNCINPEC politicians
People from Kampong Cham province
Living people
1952 births